Dimcho Ivanov Markov (born 12 November 1965) is a former Bulgarian footballer and currently manager.

References

External links
Career Statistics at Levski Sofia at LevskiSofia.info

1965 births
Living people
Bulgarian footballers
First Professional Football League (Bulgaria) players
FC Haskovo players
FC Lokomotiv Gorna Oryahovitsa players
PFC Lokomotiv Plovdiv players
PFC Levski Sofia players
Bulgarian football managers
Association football defenders